William Wigram (1780 – 8 January 1858) was an English Member of Parliament for Irish constituencies.

He was MP for the Irish constituencies of New Ross from 1807 to 1812, 1826 to 1830 and 1831 to 1832 and Wexford Borough from 1820 to 1826 and 1830 to 1831.

Wigram was also a Director of the East India Company from 1809 to 1854, acting as Chairman in 1823–24.

References

External links 
 

1780 births
1858 deaths
British East India Company
Directors of the British East India Company
British East India Company people
British Indian history
Members of the Parliament of the United Kingdom for County Wexford constituencies (1801–1922)
19th-century British people
UK MPs 1807–1812
UK MPs 1820–1826
UK MPs 1830–1831
UK MPs 1831–1832
19th-century British businesspeople